Icehouse is the debut album released by Australian rock/synthpop band Flowers, later known as Icehouse, on the independent label Regular Records in October 1980. The title and the artist are sometimes incorrectly swapped, because the band changed their name from Flowers to Icehouse after this album was released. Containing the Top 20 Australian hits "Can't Help Myself", "We Can Get Together" and "Walls"; the album made heavy use of synthesisers, which would continue to be used throughout the band's career. Founder Iva Davies wrote all the tracks including four co-written with keyboardist Michael Hoste, however Hoste was replaced during recording sessions by Anthony Smith.

In October 2010, Icehouse (1980) by Flowers was listed in the book, 100 Best Australian Albums.

Track listing
All songs written by Iva Davies, except where noted.

Personnel
Icehouse members
Iva Davies – vocals; guitar; oboe; keyboards
Michael Hoste – keyboards; piano on "Sons" (replaced by Smith during recording sessions)
John Lloyd – drums; backing vocals
Anthony Smith – keyboards; backing vocals
Keith Welsh – bass guitar; backing vocals
Additional musicians
Ian Moss – guitar on "Skin"
Geoff Oakes – saxophone on "Sons"
James SK Wān – bamboo flute
Production team
Producer: Cameron Allan, Iva Davies
Engineer: John Bee, David Cafe, Gerry Nixon
Studios: Studios 301 except "Can't Help Myself" and "Send Somebody", recorded at Paradise Studios.
Mastering: David Hemming, Rick O'Neil
Digital remastering (2002): Iva Davies, Scott Ryan, Tim Ryan
Cover art: John Lloyd
Inside art: Geoff Gifford
Photography: Grant Matthews

Charts

Weekly charts

Year-end charts

Certifications

References

1980 debut albums
Chrysalis Records albums
Icehouse (band) albums
Regular Records albums
Warner Music Group albums